Podosie  is a village in the administrative district of Gmina Krzywda, within Łuków County, Lublin Voivodeship, in eastern Poland.

Podosie was the birthplace in 1719 of Gabriel Podoski, prince-archbishop of Poland and Lithuania

References

Podosie